The Iraq women's national futsal team represents Iraq in international women's futsal competitions and is controlled by the Iraq Football Association (IFA).

History

First achievement – 2022 WAFF Championship triumph
In 2022, the Iraq Football Association has committed to provide all means to develop the level of the women's national futsal team. On 8 May 2022, Iranian Shahnaz Yari was appointed as new head coach. The team started a 10-day training camp in Tehran and played several friendly matches. Following the training camp, Shahnaz Yari selected 14 players to compete in the 2022 WAFF Championship in Jeddah. Despite a narrow 1–0 loss to Bahrain in the opening match, Iraq was undeterred and won 7–0 against Palestine. The team maintained its good performance by winning 12–0 against favourites Kuwait. This victory propelled the Iraqi women's futsal team to play the first final in its history. In the final, Iraq beat hosts Saudi Arabia 4–2 to win the first ever women's futsal title. Iraqi striker Shokhan Salihi finished as the tournament's top goalscorer with 7 goals.

Results and fixtures

Legend

Previous matches

Coaching staff

Current coaching staff

Manager history

Players

Current squad
The following players were called up to the 2022 WAFF Women's Futsal Championship.

Previous squads

WAFF Women's Futsal Championship

Competitive record
*Draws include knockout matches decided on penalty kicks.
**Gold background colour indicates that the tournament was won.
***Red border colour indicates tournament was held on home soil.

 Champions   Runners-up    Third Place    Fourth place

AFC Women's Futsal Asian Cup

Asian Indoor and Martial Arts Games

West Asian Championship

Head-to-head record
The following table shows Iraq's women's national futsal team all-time international record, correct as of 24 June 2022 (vs. ).

Honours

Titles 
Regional competitions
WAFF Women's Futsal Championship
 Champions: 2022

See also

Sport in Iraq
Iraq men's national futsal team
WAFF

References

External links
 Iraqi Football Association official website

Asian women's national futsal teams
Futsal in Iraq
National sports teams of Iraq
Women's football in Iraq